Benton Township is an inactive township in Wayne County, in the U.S. state of Missouri.

Benton Township has the name of Thomas Hart Benton, a state legislator.

References

Townships in Missouri
Townships in Wayne County, Missouri